Frederick George Sherriff OBE MC (8 March 1889 – 31 January 1943) was a British fencer who was an officer in the British Army and later the Royal Air Force.

He competed at two Olympic Games, in the men's team foil, at Paris in 1924 and Amsterdam in 1928. He was a two times British fencing champion, winning two foil titles at the British Fencing Championships in 1924 and 1925.

He had served in the First World War in the York and Lancaster Regiment and continued into the Second as a Royal Air Force officer, ultimately Group Captain.  He is buried in St Cuthbert's Churchyard, Donington, Shropshire.

References

External links
 

1889 births
1943 deaths
British male fencers
Olympic fencers of Great Britain
Fencers at the 1924 Summer Olympics
Fencers at the 1928 Summer Olympics
People from West Ham
Officers of the Order of the British Empire
Recipients of the Military Cross
York and Lancaster Regiment soldiers
British Army personnel of World War I
Royal Air Force group captains
Military personnel from London
Royal Air Force personnel killed in World War II